Zafan (also Romanized as Za‘fān, Zāfān, and Zeefan) is a village in Kasma Rural District, in the Central District of Sowme'eh Sara County, Gilan Province, Iran. 22 families made up its 77 inhabitants in 2006, according to the census.

References 

Populated places in Sowme'eh Sara County